"EXXV-TV" was the MyNetworkTV cable-only television station for the Mississippi Gulf Coast. It was controlled by Fox affiliate WXXV-TV (owned by Morris Multimedia) and was operated out of its studios on U.S. 49 in Lyman (with a Gulfport postal address). The station was only seen on the digital tier of Cable ONE systems on channel 476.

History
The market's MyNetworkTV affiliation was originally seen over-the-air on WXXV-DT2 which signed-on in September 2006. MyNetworkTV was a response to The WB and UPN merging their operations in order to form a new network, The CW. Around the same time of network partners CBS and the Warner Bros. unit of Time Warner announcing the consolidation, News Corporation (owner of Fox) made public that it too was establishing a new programming service known as MyNetworkTV. It was specifically created for television stations formally affiliated with The WB or UPN that were supposedly not announced as joining The CW in addition to offering competition on new stations.

As a MyNetworkTV outlet, WXXV-DT2 also served as the Hattiesburg/Laurel market's default affiliate since that area lacked (and still does) a locally-associated station. Its over-the-air digital signal originated from a transmitter (in unincorporated Stone County northeast of McHenry) that was strategically located and featured a directional antenna pattern to enable the station to cover all locations in Mississippi's Gulf Coast and Pine Belt regions. On June 25, 2012, it was announced WXXV would become the market's first ever locally-based NBC affiliate.

The MyNetworkTV affiliation was moved to cable-exclusive status so that WXXV-DT2 could become the NBC outlet. The reason for this was that, in order to provide enough bandwidth to continue broadcasting the Fox main channel and NBC subchannel in 720p high definition, the over-the-air signal had to remain two channels.  At this point, it joined "WNFM-TV" in Fort Myers, Florida as the only other true cable-only MyNetworkTV affiliate. A third outlet, "WAMY-TV" in Huntsville, Alabama, also has a fictional call sign but it is housed on a subchannel of an off-air station.

On January 1, 2015, WXXV took over promotional and advertising responsibilities of the market's cable-only CW affiliate "WBGP" from Cable ONE. As a result, the service was added to a new third subchannel of WXXV in order to offer over-the-air viewers access to The CW for the first time. Except for local commercials, all programming is provided through the national CW Plus service. Although "WBGP" was seen on the basic tier of Cable ONE, WXXV-DT3 is only available on digital channel 476 which was the location of this cable-exclusive MyNetworkTV station. At the same time that WXXV-DT3 launched, MyNetworkTV programming moved to a secondary affiliation on WXXV's primary channel and can be seen on weeknights from 10 until midnight.

External links
WXXV-TV

Television stations in Biloxi, Mississippi
Defunct television stations in the United States
Defunct mass media in Mississippi
Television channels and stations established in 2012
Television channels and stations disestablished in 2015